"Bright Yellow Gun" is the only single by Throwing Muses from their 1995 album University. An accompanying video was also made directed by Kevin Kerslake.

Track listing
All songs written by Kristin Hersh except where noted.

Personnel
Throwing Muses
Kristin Hersh – Lead vocals, guitar
Bernard Georges – Bass
David Narcizo – Drums

Production
 Art Direction, Design – Vaughan Oliver 
 Co-producer, Engineer – Phill Brown (tracks: 1, 3, 4) 
 Design [Assistant] – Stine Schyberg 
 Engineer, Mixed By – Trina Shoemaker

References

1994 singles
4AD singles
1994 songs
Music videos directed by Kevin Kerslake
Throwing Muses songs